Herbert Horatio Nichols (January 3, 1919 – April 12, 1963) was an American jazz pianist and composer who wrote the jazz standard "Lady Sings the Blues". Obscure during his lifetime, he is now highly regarded by many musicians and critics.

Life
He was born in San Juan Hill, Manhattan, New York, United States, to parents from St. Kitts and Trinidad, and grew up in Harlem. During much of his career, he took work as a Dixieland musician while also pursuing the more adventurous kind of jazz he preferred. He is best known today for program music that combines bop, Dixieland, and music from the Caribbean with harmonies from Erik Satie and Béla Bartók.

His first known work as a musician was with the Royal Barons in 1937, but he did not find performing at Minton's Playhouse a few years later a very happy experience, as the competitive environment did not suit him. However, he did become friends with pianist Thelonious Monk.

Nichols was drafted into the Army in 1941. After the war, he worked in various settings, beginning to achieve some recognition when Mary Lou Williams recorded some of his songs in 1952. From about 1947, he persisted in trying to persuade Alfred Lion at Blue Note Records to sign him up. He finally recorded some of his compositions for Blue Note in 1955 and 1956, some of which were not issued until the 1980s. His tune "Serenade" had lyrics added, and as "Lady Sings the Blues" became identified with Billie Holiday. In 1957, he recorded his last album as leader for Bethlehem Records.

Nichols died of leukemia in New York City at the age of 44.

One of the four essays in A.B. Spellman's Four Lives in the Bebop Business (also known as Four Jazz Lives, 1966) is about Nichols. A biography, Herbie Nichols: A Jazzist's Life, written by Mark Miller, was published in 2009.

Influence
Nichols's music was energetically promoted by Roswell Rudd, who worked with Nichols in the early 1960s. Rudd released three albums featuring Nichols's compositions (Regeneration, issued in 1983 by Soul Note, and The Unheard Herbie Nichols (1997), issued by CIMP in two volumes), as well as a book The Unpublished Works (2000).

In 1984, the Steve Lacy quintet with George E. Lewis, Misha Mengelberg, Han Bennink, and Arjen Gorter performed the music of Nichols at the Ravenna Jazz Festival in Italy.

A New York group, the Herbie Nichols Project (part of the Jazz Composers Collective) has recorded three albums largely dedicated to unrecorded Nichols' compositions, many of which Nichols had deposited in the Library of Congress.

Discography

As leader

Compilations
 1952: Herbie Nichols Quartet (Savoy; first LP issue: Various Artists I Just Love Jazz Piano - Down And Out (1957), session sometimes reissued with the Gigi Gryce album Nica's Tempo)
 The Complete Blue Note Recordings (Blue Note; reissued by Mosaic)

As sideman
 1953: Rex Stewart and his Dixielanders Dixieland Free-For-All (Jazztone, 1956)
 1958: Vic Dickenson & Joe Thomas, Mainstream (Atlantic)

References

Further reading 
 

1919 births
1963 deaths
People from Manhattan
American people of Trinidad and Tobago descent
American jazz composers
American male jazz composers
American jazz pianists
American male pianists
Bebop pianists
Dixieland pianists
Blue Note Records artists
Jazz musicians from New York (state)
20th-century American male musicians
20th-century American pianists
Bethlehem Records artists
20th-century jazz composers